Sir Robert Marsham, 4th Baronet (16 December 1650 – 25 July 1703) was an English politician who sat in the House of Commons from 1698 to 1702.

Marsham was the son of Sir John Marsham, 1st Baronet and lived at Bushey Hall, Hertfordshire. He matriculated at St John's College, Oxford in 1666, and entered the Middle Temple in 1669.

He was one of the six Clerks of Chancery. He succeeded his nephew John (who died a minor) to the baronetcy in 1696, inheriting from him the Mote in Maidstone, Kent, where he thereafter lived.

Marsham was elected Member of Parliament for Maidstone in 1698 and held the seat until 1702.

Marsham died in July 1703, aged 52. He had married Margaret Bosvile daughter of Thomas Bosvile of Little Motte, Eynsford, Kent. They had three sons and four daughters.  Five of their children were nominated in the first British tontine in 1693. Their son, Robert, who succeeded to the baronetcy, was elevated to the peerage as Baron Romney in 1716.

References

1650 births
1703 deaths
Baronets in the Baronetage of England
English MPs 1698–1700
English MPs 1701
English MPs 1701–1702
English MPs 1702–1705
Alumni of St John's College, Oxford
Members of the Middle Temple